Eunice Michaella Lagusad (born May 18, 1998) is a Filipina actress and vlogger. She is popularly known as Charming in the hit drama series Princess Charming. She is currently a freelance actress but is mostly seen in GMA Network.

Career
Lagusad was 8 years old when she became famous for her role as young Charming in GMA 7's Bakekang (2006), starring Sunshine Dizon. She played the daughter of Ogie Alcasid in the QTV 11 sitcom Ay, Robot! with Sam Bumatay. She starred in Princess Charming (2007) with Krystal Reyes as Charming Santo.

She also appeared in ABS-CBN's TV adaptation of Princess Sarah (2007), starring Sharlene San Pedro; Goin' Bulilit; and Aryana, starring Ella Cruz.

Filmography

Television

Movies

References

External links

1998 births
Living people
Filipino child actresses
Actresses from Manila
Star Magic
Viva Artists Agency